Jan Marinus Domela (August 22, 1894 in The Hague – August 1, 1973 in Santa Monica, California) was a Dutch-born American artist and illustrator.

Johan Domela Nieuwenhuis, also Jan Marinus Domela became interested in art while at boarding school in Switzerland. While visiting his sister in California he studied at the Los Angeles School of Illustration and Painting and the Mark Hopkins Art Institute; back in the Netherlands in 1925, he attended the Rijksakademie in Amsterdam before completing his studies at the Académie Julian in Paris.

After returning to California in 1928 Dolema was made the chief matte painter at Paramount Studios, and was chief artist in the special effects department until 1968. Creating landscapes for most of the movies produced by Paramount for over thirty years, he received several Academy Awards for his work.

Domela was part of the production team who received an Academy Honorary Award at the 11th Academy Awards for their efforts on the Paramount film Spawn of the North. Domela exhibited his own landscape paintings of subjects such as the Monterey Peninsula, the California Sierras, the Alps, and Monhegan Island, at venues including the Los Angeles County Museum.

Notes

References
 Belanger, Pamela J. Maine in America: American Art at the Farnsworth Art Museum. University Press of New England, 2000. 
 The Oscar Site

1894 births
1973 deaths
20th-century American painters
American male painters
Modern painters
Painters from California
Dutch painters
Dutch male painters
Academy Honorary Award recipients
Dutch emigrants to the United States
Artists from The Hague
20th-century American male artists